Giovanni Giacomo del Balzo (died 1512) was a Roman Catholic prelate who served as Bishop of Alessano (1488–1512).

Biography
In 1488, Giovanni Giacomo del Balzo was appointed during the papacy of Pope Innocent VIII as Bishop of Alessano. 
He served as Bishop of Alessano until his death in 1512.

See also 
Catholic Church in Italy

References

External links and additional sources
 (for Chronology of Bishops) 
 (for Chronology of Bishops) 

1512 deaths
16th-century Italian Roman Catholic bishops
15th-century Italian Roman Catholic bishops
Bishops appointed by Pope Innocent VIII